Pashneh Daran (also Romanized as Pāshneh Dārān; also known as Pāshneh Dar, Pāshneh Darū, and Pāshteh Darān) is a village in Dastgerdan Rural District, Dastgerdan District, Tabas County, South Khorasan Province, Iran. At the 2006 census, its population was 23, in 8 families.

References 

Populated places in Tabas County